The Kirchdorf Wildcats are an American football team in Kirchdorf am Inn, Germany. The club's greatest success came in 2017 when it won the southern division of the German Football League 2 and earned the right to play-off for promotion to the German Football League which they won against the Saarland Hurricanes.

The club was formed as the Simbach Wildcats in 1986, then based in Simbach am Inn. It was renamed in early 2004 after the club had moved to Kirchdorf.

History
The club was formed in 1986 as the Simbach Wildcats in Simbach am Inn, Bavaria. After only playing friendlies in its first two seasons the club entered the Bavarian league in 1988. It won a league championship in 1992 and earned promotion to the 2. Bundesliga, a league later renamed to GFL 2. In 1994 the club won the southern division of the 2. Bundesliga but lost both games against the Stuttgart Scorpions in the promotion round and had to remain in its league. By 1998 the Wildcats were suffering from a lack of players, forcing the club to voluntarily withdraw from the 2. Bundesliga to the tier four Bayernliga.

The Wildcats quickly recovered from their decline, winning the Bayernliga title in 1999 and moving up to the Regionalliga. After three seasons at this level another league championship in 2002, followed by a victory over Wiesbaden Phantoms in the promotion play-offs, took the club back to the 2. Bundesliga. The following season, 2003, the club won another title in the southern division of the 2. Bundesliga. In the promotion round to the German Football League Simbach lost on aggregate against Marburg Mercenaries, missing out on promotion to the highest level for a second time. At the end of the season the club decided to relocate to Kirchdorf. In March 2004 the club received permission to change its name to Kirchdorf Wildcats after a move from Simbach to Kirchdorf.

Five more seasons in the 2. Bundesliga followed in which the club slowly declined in performance. In 2008 the club decided to withdraw from the 2. Bundesliga for a second time, this time to the level below, the Regionalliga. Kirchdorf won the southern division of this league in 2009 and 2010 but missed out on promotion in 2009 when it lost to the Holzgerlingen Twister. The year after it was more successful and returned to the 2. Bundesliga, now renamed GFL 2. After three average seasons there from 2011 to 2013 the club took out the division championship in 2014 once more. The later qualified the Wildcats for the promotion round to the GFL once more where it faced the Franken Knights for a spot in Germany's highest league but lost both games. In the 2015 season Kirchdorf finished in third place. The 2017 season was a great success for the club. They won the GFL 2 South Championship and then beat the Saarland Hurricanes in relegation. Starting in 2018 they will compete in the GFL, Germany's highest league.

Honours
 GFL 2
 Southern Division champions: 1994, 2003, 2014, 2017

Recent seasons
Recent seasons of the club:

 PR = Promotion round.
 RR = Relegation round.

References

External links
  Official website
  German Football League official website
  Football History Historic American football tables from Germany

American football in Bavaria
German Football League teams
American football teams in Germany
American football teams established in 1986
1986 establishments in West Germany
Rottal-Inn